HWI may refer to:

 Hauptman-Woodward Medical Research Institute, in Buffalo, New York, United States
 Healthware International, an Italian advertising company
 High water interval, or lunitidal interval, of tides
 Horwich Parkway railway station, England
 Hot water immersion therapy
 Humanity World International
 Wismar, Germany
 Hardware Wholesalers, Inc., now Do It Best, an American hardware retailer